Ondřej Kaše (born 8 November 1995) is a Czech professional ice hockey forward for the Carolina Hurricanes of the National Hockey League (NHL). He previously played with the Toronto Maple Leafs, Boston Bruins, and Anaheim Ducks of the National Hockey League (NHL). Kase was selected by the Anaheim Ducks in the seventh round, 205th overall during the 2014 NHL Entry Draft.

Playing career

Czech Republic
Kaše made his Czech Extraliga debut playing with Piráti Chomutov debut during the 2013–14 Czech Extraliga season. Kaše recorded seven points in 37 games for Chomutov, while also appearing in five games with SK Kadan. At the conclusion of the season, Kaše was selected in the seventh round, 205th overall during the 2014 NHL Entry Draft. Kaše increased his scoring totals the following season, scoring seven goals and 21 points in 37 games.

Anaheim Ducks
On 14 May 2015, Kaše was signed to a three-year entry-level contract with the Ducks. Kaše spent the entirety of the 2015–16 season with the Ducks' American Hockey League (AHL) affiliate, the San Diego Gulls. In 25 games with the club, Kaše scored eight goals and 14 points. He also contributed one goal and four points in nine postseason games.

On 4 November 2016, Kaše recorded his first career NHL point, assisting on a goal by Antoine Vermette during a 5–1 win over the Arizona Coyotes. One month later on 1 December, Kaše scored his first career goal against Ryan Miller of the Vancouver Canucks in a 3–1 win. Kaše finished his rookie season with five goals and 15 points in 53 games. The following season, Kaše upped his totals by scoring 20 goals and 38 points in 66 games.

On 15 August 2018, the Ducks re-signed Kaše to a three-year, $7.8 million contract extension worth $2.6 million annually. He played in 30 games for the Ducks, recording 20 points, before requiring season-ending surgery after an injury in a game against the Minnesota Wild.

Boston Bruins
On 21 February 2020, Kaše was traded to the Boston Bruins in exchange for David Backes, Axel Andersson and a 2020 first-round pick. Plagued by injury in his tenure with the Bruins, Kaše was limited to just 3 games in the pandemic shortened  season due to lingering concussion symptoms. As a restricted free agent, Kaše was not tendered a qualifying offer by the Bruins, releasing him to free agency.

Toronto Maple Leafs
On 30 July 2021, Kaše was signed to a one-year, $1.25 million contract with the Toronto Maple Leafs. On 25 April, 2022, Kaše was chosen as the Maple Leafs' nominee for the Bill Masterton Memorial Trophy for his dedication and perseverance to the sport after a series of serious head injuries. As a restricted free agent, Kaše was not tendered a qualifying offer by the Leafs, releasing him to free agency.

Carolina Hurricanes 
On 13 July 2022, Kaše was signed to a one-year, $1.5 million contract with the Carolina Hurricanes.

Personal
Kaše's younger brother, David, played alongside him for Piráti Chomutov and was selected in the fifth round, 128th overall, by the Philadelphia Flyers in the 2015 NHL Entry Draft.

Career statistics

Regular season and playoffs

International

References

External links

1995 births
Anaheim Ducks draft picks
Anaheim Ducks players
Boston Bruins players
Carolina Hurricanes players
Czech ice hockey right wingers
Living people
People from Kadaň
Piráti Chomutov players
San Diego Gulls (AHL) players
Toronto Maple Leafs players
Sportspeople from the Ústí nad Labem Region
Czech expatriate ice hockey players in Canada
Czech expatriate ice hockey players in the United States